The Georgia Railroad and Banking Company  also seen as "GARR", was a historic railroad and banking company that operated in the U.S. state of Georgia.

History 
The company was chartered in 1833 in Augusta, Georgia. In 1835, the charter was amended to include banking. Originally the line was chartered to build a railroad from Augusta to Athens, with a branch to Madison.

The  gauge railroad opened in 1845 with J. Edgar Thomson as its Chief Engineer and Richard Peters as its first Superintendent.

At that time the rates were as follows:
 5¢ per mile for passengers
 50¢ per  for freight

Several other railroads were then under construction:  
The South Carolina Railroad was building a line from Charleston to North Augusta, South Carolina (formerly Hamburg).
The Memphis and Charleston Railroad was being built from Memphis to Chattanooga.
The Nashville and Chattanooga Railroad and the Louisville and Nashville Railroad (L&N) were both constructing rival lines between Louisville, Kentucky, and Nashville, Tennessee.

The Georgia Railroad decided to extend the Madison branch to Terminus (Atlanta) and thereby compete with the Central Railroad and Banking Company of Georgia (later the Central of Georgia Railroad), which together with the Macon & Western Railroad, was competing for traffic through Charleston's rival port of Savannah, Georgia. At the time, goods from the Mississippi and Ohio valleys had to go by riverboat to New Orleans and then via coastal steamships around the Florida Keys, to get to the big population centers in the Northeast. Shipping cross-country by rail to the ports of Charleston and Savannah made perfect economic sense.

Banking
The banking side of the business was quickly more successful than the railroad side. The Georgia Railroad & Banking Company was perhaps the strongest bank in Georgia for many years. The bankers used some of their wealth to buy controlling interests in the Atlanta & West Point Railroad (A&WP) and the Western Railway of Alabama (WofA), which provided a continuous line from Atlanta to Montgomery, Alabama, although the WofA was standard gauge, while all the other lines in the South were broad gauge.

Civil War

During the American Civil War, the Confederate States of America maintained a gunpowder factory in Augusta. Carloads of gunpowder would be transported on the Georgia Railroad to various battlefields in the "Western Campaign."

Although the Civil War saw heavy damage to railroads such as the Georgia Railroad, management used their considerable resources to restore operation as quickly as possible.  The Georgia Railroad even resorted to temporarily abandoning the Athens branch to secure enough rail to reopen its main line.  After their defeat, returning Confederate soldiers were given free rides home, to the extent that the company's limited rail network would allow.

They also honored all Confederate scrip issued by their bank.  No depositor lost their savings even if Confederate money had no value. It helped that the Georgia Railroad and Banking Company had the financial strength to honor those promises. At that time, most Southern banks were repudiating any obligations related to Confederate currency. This helped to solidify the bank's reputation as one of the premier banks in the southeastern United States, well into the 20th century.

Post-war years

The Georgia Railroad Freight Depot, designed by architect Max Corput, was completed in 1869 and is the oldest building in Downtown Atlanta. The company was later re-chartered as the Georgia Railroad Bank, then a subsidiary of the First Railroad and Banking Company, which eventually opened banks in Atlanta under the name of First Georgia Bank. The banking operations were merged with First Union in 1986 and First Union subsequently merged with Wachovia Corporation (now Wells Fargo).

The Georgia Railroad Bank entered the insurance business using subsidiaries such as First of Georgia, however these were subsequently sold, at considerable profit to the company.

In 1881, Colonel William M. Wadley, Central Railroad and Banking Company of Georgia president, leased the railroad properties of the Georgia Railroad and Banking Company, including the A&WP and WofA. Wadley assigned half of the lease to his company and half to the L&N. Following the Panic of 1896, the Central went into receivership and its portion of the lease lapsed, whereupon it was eventually reassigned to the Atlantic Coast Line Railroad (ACL). In 1902, the ACL acquired controlling interest in the L&N; thus the Georgia, A&WP, and WofA became non-operating subsidiaries of the Atlantic Coast Line. In 1909, white firemen of the Georgia Railroad, organized under the Brotherhood of Locomotive Firemen and Enginemen, went on a mass strike.

With the building of the Savannah and Atlanta Railroad, which connected with the Georgia Railroad at Warrenton, the Georgia Railroad now competed with the Central of Georgia Railroad for traffic to and from Savannah. Soon the ACL came to dominate the Augusta interchange traffic, through its Charleston and Western Carolina Railway subsidiary and via the ACL's spur from its main line at Florence, South Carolina, in order that the Georgia Railroad could compete with the Seaboard Air Line Railroad and Southern Railway for traffic from Atlanta up the Eastern seaboard.

By the opening of the 1960s, passenger service was reduced to an overnight through-train from Atlanta to Augusta, continuing as an Atlantic Coast Line Railroad train to Wilmington, North Carolina, and a day train from Atlanta, making connections at Augusta with an ACL train bound for Florence, South Carolina.

A unique feature of the Georgia Railroad and Banking Company charter was that the state legislature gave the corporation large tax breaks, which were legally challenged on several occasions. The charter also called for daily-except-Sunday passenger service. The lawyers advised management to maintain passenger service on all lines, so as to not violate the charter. The Georgia was perhaps the last railroad to operate both freight and inter-city passenger trains in the "Lower 48" states, into the Amtrak era.

CSX
The Georgia Railroad originally fell under common management with the Atlanta & West Point Railroad and the Western Railway of Alabama, commonly known as "the West Point Route."

In 1967, ACL merged with the Seaboard Air Line Railroad to form the Seaboard Coast Line Railroad (SCL). SCL continued to operate the Georgia Railroad as a subsidiary alongside the Louisville & Nashville Railroad and the Clinchfield Railroad. These were known collectively as the "Family Lines System." SCL continued to operate the Georgia Railroad under its initial charter; the Georgia Railroad was maintained as a separate company, with SCL leasing the rail properties. Two years later, the Georgia Railroad ended its traditional passenger service, though it continued to operate a bare-bones mixed train service between Atlanta (Atlanta Union Station) and Augusta (Augusta Union Station).

In 1980, SCL merged with Chessie System to form CSX Corporation. In 1982, SCL and L&N merged to form the Seaboard System Railroad, beginning what would be a process in which the CSX operating companies would be merged into a single railroad. The Georgia Railroad was the first to be merged away. The railroad properties of the Georgia Railroad and Banking Company, which had been operated under a lease for 90 years by CSX and its predecessors, were formally merged into Seaboard System Railroad. The mixed train service also ended that year.

In 1986, Seaboard System Railroad renamed itself CSX Transportation.  The same year, Georgia Railroad Bank was acquired by First Union; most former branches are now part of Wells Fargo. A year later, Chessie System merged into CSX Transportation.

After a period of somewhat heavy use during the CSX ownership, most through traffic has been diverted from the former Georgia Railroad mainline. As of October 2018, only a single through train in each direction daily uses the line.

1867 rail timetable

Distances of depots from Atlanta

Trains departed from Atlanta at 8:55am and 7:15pm and arrived in Augusta at 6:00pm and 10:05am.

See also

Crawford Depot (Crawford, Georgia)
Athens Line

References

External links
Georgia Railroad Bank and Trust/Wachovia Bank, N.A. at the New Georgia Encyclopedia

Defunct Georgia (U.S. state) railroads
Railway lines in Atlanta
Seaboard System Railroad
Defunct banks of the United States
Predecessors of CSX Transportation
Railway companies established in 1835
Railway companies disestablished in 1982
5 ft gauge railways in the United States
American companies established in 1835